Rubyspira is a genus of deep water sea snails, marine gastropod mollusks unclassified in the family within the superfamily Abyssochrysoidea.

Distribution
They are known from Monterey Bay, California.

Species
Species within the genus Rubyspira include:
 Rubyspira goffrediae Johnson, Warén, Lee, Kano, Kaim, Davis, Strong & Vrijenhoek, 2010
 Rubyspira osteovora Johnson, Warén, Lee, Kano, Kaim, Davis, Strong & Vrijenhoek, 2010 - type species of the genus Rubyspira
 Rubyspira from São Paulo Ridge (undescribed species)

Ecology
They are specialized bone-eating snails on whale falls. They were found on carcass of gray whale. Their main food source are bones of whales.

References

External links 

Caenogastropoda